Corinth station may refer to two stations in Corinth, Greece:
Corinth railway station (old), the railway station that served Corinth until the mid-2000s
Corinth railway station, the new railway station in Corinth that opened in 2005